Huddersfield Town's 1931–32 campaign was a season that saw Town continue their impressive run of success under Clem Stephenson, by finishing 4th in Division 1. The season is mostly noted for two reasons: the impressive record of 42 goals scored by Dave Mangnall, a club record still to this day, and for the record crowd set during Town's sixth round FA Cup clash with Arsenal during the season.

Squad at the start of the season

Review
After finishing 5th the previous season, Town's reimbursed team carried their rich vein of form and managed an impressive run up the table, mainly thanks to the 33 league goals supplied by Dave Mangnall, which saw Town climb up to 4th place in the table. Combined with the 9 goals in the FA Cup, Mangnall's 42 goals give him the individual record of goals for a season in Town's history.

The season is also notable for Town's impressive FA Cup run. After wins over Oldham Athletic, Queens Park Rangers and Preston North End, Town met Herbert Chapman's Arsenal in the 6th round at Leeds Road. The match was watched by over 67,000 people and saw Town lose to a goal in the 2nd minute.

Squad at the end of the season

Results

Division One

FA Cup

Appearances and goals

Huddersfield Town A.F.C. seasons
Huddersfield Town F.C.